Martin Truex Sr. (born March 24, 1958) is an American former driver in the Busch North Series. He is the father of 2017 NASCAR Cup Series champion Martin Truex Jr. and NASCAR Xfinity Series driver Ryan Truex. Truex Sr. retired to advance Martin's career. He owns commercial fishing company, Sea Watch International. 

He made 15 starts in the Busch Series from 1989 to 1998. His best finish came in 1994, when he finished 12th at Nazareth Speedway.

Motorsports career results

NASCAR
(key) (Bold – Pole position awarded by qualifying time. Italics – Pole position earned by points standings or practice time. * – Most laps led.)

Busch Series

Craftsman Truck Series

Busch North Series

Winston Modified Tour

 Competed only in companion events with Busch North Series as BNS driver and ineligible for Busch Series points

References

External links

Living people
1948 births
People from Stafford Township, New Jersey
Racing drivers from New Jersey
NASCAR drivers
NASCAR team owners
Sportspeople from Ocean County, New Jersey